Ambika Soni (born 13 November 1942) is an Indian politician belonging to Indian National Congress. She had served as Minister of Information and Broadcasting. She was a Member of Parliament representing the state of Punjab in the Rajya Sabha.

Early life and education
Born in Lahore in undivided Punjab to Nakul Sen Wadhwa, an Indian Civil Service officer and Lt. Governor of Goa  in 1942. Her mother, Indu Wadhwa, was a home-maker. The family was initially Hindu, but converted to Christianity.

Ambika studied at Welham Girls School, New Delhi and did her M.A. (Hons.) from Indraprastha College, Delhi University, followed by Diploma Superiore en Langue Francaise from Alliance Francaise, Bangkok and Post-Graduate Diploma in Spanish Art and Literature from University of Havana, Cuba. 

In 1961, aged 19, Ambika married Uday Soni, an Indian Foreign Service officer, who was also at first a Hindu. It was a few years after marriage that the family converted to Christianity and had a child.

Political career

As Member of Indian National Congress 
Ambika Soni began her political career in 1969 when she was co-opted into the Congress Party by Indira Gandhi at the time of the Party split in 1969. Soni was an old family friend of Gandhi from the time when her father was posted as District collector of Amritsar during the Partition of India and worked very closely with Jawaharlal Nehru.  In 1975 she was elected as the president of the Indian Youth Congress and worked closely with Sanjay Gandhi. In 1998, she became the president of All India Mahila Congress. From 1999 - 2006 she was General Secretary of All India Congress Committee.

As Member of Parliament, Rajya Sabha 
Following is from the official website of Rajya Sabha

First Term (March 1976 - March 1982)

Second Term (January 2000 - 10 June 2004)

Third Term (July 2004 - July 2010)

Fourth Term (July 2010 - July 2016)

Fifth Term (July 2016 - July 2022)

As Cabinet Minister

References

External links

 Profile at National Portal of India

 

1942 births
Indian National Congress politicians from Punjab, India
Living people
Indraprastha College for Women alumni
Members of the Cabinet of India
Indian Youth Congress Presidents
Rajya Sabha members from Punjab, India
Women in Punjab, India politics
People from Lahore
20th-century Indian women politicians
20th-century Indian politicians
21st-century Indian women politicians
21st-century Indian politicians
Women members of the Cabinet of India
Ministers for Information and Broadcasting of India
Women members of the Rajya Sabha
Indian National Congress (U) politicians
Culture Ministers of India
Indian Congress (Socialist) politicians